Merey Akshalov (born May 8, 1988) is an amateur boxer from Kazakhstan. He competed at Beijing's 2008 Summer Olympics in the lightweight division. He defeated Hungarian Miklos Varga (12:3), but lost to local Hu Qing (7:11).

References

1988 births
Living people
Boxers at the 2008 Summer Olympics
Olympic boxers of Kazakhstan
World boxing champions
Kazakhstani male boxers
AIBA World Boxing Championships medalists
Light-welterweight boxers
21st-century Kazakhstani people